My Friend is the fifth Korean studio album by SG Wannabe. As of April 23, 2008, SG Wannabe's fifth album had 85,000 pre-orders and counting. The album was slated to be released on April 24 with fourteen new tracks, including a Japanese version of "I Miss You" ("보고싶어").

SG Wannabe's new member, Lee Seok-hoon, also made his debut performance on April 24 on Mnet's M Countdown, singing the first track, "Lalala", on the new album.

Music videos
Two version of music video were released for "Lalala". The first version featured former Jewelry member, Cho Min Ah, Yoo In-young, and Seo Jun-young. Part 2 of the music video featured music by M to M's third album. The second version of the music video featured the SG Wannabe members.

The music video for "Smooth Break Up" featured SG Wannabe, T-ara's Hyomin and Qri, and Spica's Jiwon.

The music video for "I Miss You" was for Yeon Ga 2008, which featured Song Seung-heon, Park Yong-ha, Ha Seok-jin and more.

Notable tracks

"Lalala"
"Lalala" was SG Wannabe's title track for this album. Instead of a ballad track, "Lalala" had country-style tempo and was enjoyed by many fans.

"Smooth Break Up"
"Smooth Break Up" was SG Wannabe's follow-up track. "Smooth Break Up" is a medium-tempo song combined with a Latin beat.

"I Miss You"
"I Miss You" was also a track for Yeon Ga 2008. "I Miss You" is a touching ballad song. Both versions of "I Miss You" ("보고싶어") were recorded with their former member Chae Dong Ha. The Korean one was recorded with 4 people and the Japanese version was recorded by the original members.

Track listing

References

SG Wannabe albums
Stone Music Entertainment albums
2008 albums